The Roosevelt School in Casper, Wyoming, originally named North Casper School, was designed by leading Wyoming architectural firm Garbutt, Weidner & Sweeney in 1921 and was built in 1922.  Need for the school followed from a post-World War I boom in Casper's economy and population, connected to a boom in the petroleum industry there.  The school served as a neighborhood center in an otherwise-neglected area of the town.

The North Casper area was across railroad tracks from the rest of Casper, and was fast-growing.  In the words of Vivian Dwyer, principal of the school, it was "a district of small homes, meager means, and large families." Schooling was not available to all.

In 1921 an expansion of the existing school was planned, but instead a new building was designed and built.  Only one wing of six classrooms was finished in a timely fashion, due perhaps to a union-related work stoppage.

The school was named for Theodore Roosevelt.

It was listed on the U.S. National Register of Historic Places in 1997.

References

External links
Roosevelt School (North Casper School), at Wyoming State Historic Preservation Office

School buildings on the National Register of Historic Places in Wyoming
School buildings completed in 1922
Buildings and structures in Casper, Wyoming
National Register of Historic Places in Natrona County, Wyoming
1922 establishments in Wyoming